Thatcher – The Musical! was a theatrical production staged by the Foursight Theatre concerning the life of the former British Prime Minister Margaret Thatcher.

See also
Cultural depictions of Margaret Thatcher

References

External links
Official website

Musical
Works about prime ministers of the United Kingdom
Plays based on real people
Plays set in the 20th century
Biographical plays about politicians
2006 musicals